Michael Tilmouth (30 November 1930 – 12 November 1987) was an English musicologist.

Biography
Born in Grimsby, Michael Tilmouth was educated at Christ's College, Cambridge, graduating in 1954 and completing his doctoral studies in 1960 with his thesis Chamber music in England, 1675–1720. 

He was appointed an assistant lecturer at the University of Glasgow in 1959; promotion to lecturer followed in 1962, before he was appointed to the new Tovey Chair of Music at the University of Edinburgh in 1971. 

Alongside editions of 17th- and 18th-century chamber music, he edited Musica Britannica, contributing two volumes of Matthew Locke's chamber music.

Death
He died in the office on 12 November 1987, aged 56.

References 

1930 births
1987 deaths
English musicologists
People from Grimsby
Alumni of Christ's College, Cambridge
Academics of the University of Glasgow
Academics of the University of Edinburgh